Tanyard Hollow is a valley in Jasper and Newton Counties in the U.S. state of Missouri.

Tanyard Hollow was so named on account of the tannery it once contained.

References

Valleys of Jasper County, Missouri
Valleys of Newton County, Missouri
Valleys of Missouri